The Great East was a governorate (gouvernement) of the Dutch East Indies between 1938 and 1946. It comprised all the islands to the east of Borneo (Celebes, the Moluccas, and West New Guinea, with their offshore islands) and of Java (Bali and the Lesser Sunda Islands). Its capital was Macassar on Celebes.

The Great East was created with the merger of its constituent residencies on 25 May 1938 and was ruled by a governor.  The first governor was G. A. W. Ch. de Haze Winkelman. Following World War II, the governorate (except for Netherlands New Guinea) became the State of the Great East (later the State of East Indonesia) on 24 December 1946. This state became a constituent of the federal United States of Indonesia in 1949 and was integrated into a unitary Indonesia in 1950 (except West New Guinea, which was only integrated in 1963). As of March 2020, the area is divided into the eastern 13 of Indonesia's 34 provinces.

Administrative divisions
The Great East gouvernement consisted of the following residencies:
Bali and Lombok (Singaradja)
Celebes en Onderhoorigheden (Macassar), including southern Celebes and neighbouring islands
Menado (Menado), including all of northern Celebes
Moluccas (Amboina), including the Moluccas, West New Guinea, and other outlying islands such as Wetar and Aru
Timor en Onderhoorigheden (Kupang), including western Timor and the other Lesser Sunda Islands (except for Bali and Lombok)

See also
 State of East Indonesia

Notes

References

\* 

Indonesia in World War II
History of New Guinea
History of Timor
West Timor
Western New Guinea
1938 establishments in the Dutch East Indies
1946 disestablishments in the Dutch East Indies
Defunct organizations based in the Dutch East Indies